Jock Ross may refer to:

Jock Ross (rugby player) (born 1949), New Zealand rugby player
William "Jock" Ross (born 1943), Australian outlaw biker